The Perak State Herb Park is a park in Batu Gajah, Kinta District, Perak, Malaysia.

History
The park used to be an abandoned tin mining area. Since 1987, the area had been used for vegetable plantation. In 2002, Perak Chief Minister Tajol Rosli Mohd Ghazali suggested the establishment of the Perak State Herb Park. Since then, various plants have been planted at the park. The park was officially opened on 18 June 2009 by Perak Sultan Azlan Shah.

Geology
The park consists of more than 500 different species of plants.

Activities
Various activities can be done in this park, such as cycling, camping, trekking, fishing etc.

Facilities
The park is equipped with car parks, toilet, prayer room, camping field, hall etc.

Opening time
The park is opened on weekdays from 8:00 a.m. to 5:00 p.m.

See also
 List of tourist attractions in Perak

References

External links
  (Malay)
 YouTube - Taman Herba Negeri Perak

2009 establishments in Malaysia
Geography of Perak
Kinta District
Parks in Malaysia